The 2014 African Artistic Gymnastics Championships was the 12th iteration of the event and took place on March 27–30 in Pretoria, South Africa.

Medal winners

Senior

References

Africa
International sports competitions hosted by South Africa
African Artistic Gymnastics Championships
African Artistic Gymnastics Championships